Media24 is South Africa’s leading media company with interests in digital media and services, newspapers, magazines, ecommerce, book publishing, television, logistics and distribution. It is part of Naspers, a multinational group of media and ecommerce platforms.

The company is headquartered in the Media24 Centre, in Foreshore, Cape Town.

Background

Welkom Yizani 

Welkom Yizani is a black empowerment share scheme launched by Media24 in September 2006. This scheme owns 15 percent of Media24, a subsidiary of Naspers Ltd. Media24 received R1.4 billion after the unbundling of Novus Holdings in 2017. At the Media24/Welkom Yizani annual general meeting it was announced that shareholders will receive a special cash dividend of not less than R14.79 per Welkom Yizani ordinary share. In addition, the board declared an ordinary dividend of 42.5 cents per share.

Shareholders of Welkom Yizani accepted Media24’s cash offer to buy out all the shares at a special general meeting held on 22 January 2021. The transaction has been concluded, Welkom Yizani was delisted from the Equity Express Securities Exchange (EESE) and the scheme has been unwound. Click here for access to the Welkom Yizani website.

Criticism
16 March 2018 Media24 agreed to pay R14 million as a settlement agreement with the Competition Commission after admitting to price fixing and fixing of trade conditions in the media industry.

Publications

Magazines

Baba & Kleuter
DRUM
Fairlady
Huisgenoot
Kick Off
Kuier
Landbouweekblad
Lose It
Man Magnum
SA Jagter
SARIE
SARIE Bruid
SARIE Kos
TRUE LOVE
Tuis/Home
TvPlus
Weg!/go!
Weg! Platteland/go! Platteland
WegRY & Sleep / go! Drive & Camp
YOU
Your Baby & Pregnancy

Newspapers
 Beeld
 Bloemnuus/news
 Breederivier Gazette
 City Press
 City Vision
 Daily Sun
 Die Burger
 District Mail & Helderberg Gazette
 Eikestadnuus
 Express
 Hermanus Times
 Isolomzi Express
 Kouga Express
 Mid-Karoo Express
 Mthatha Express
 Noordkaap Express
 Paarl Post
 Rapport
 Soccer Laduma
 Son
 Swartland Gazette
 TygerBurger
 UD Express
 Vista
 Volksblad
 VrystaatKroon
 Weskus Nuus
 Weslander

Online Publications
 News24
 Netwerk24
 SNL24
 Careers24
 Business Insider

Books
 NB Publishers
 Via Afrika
 Collegium 
 Van Schaik Publishers 
 Jonathan Ball Publishers

TV channels

VIA

VIA is a 24-hour Afrikaans lifestyle channel that celebrates ordinary people and the world they inhabit. Its wide selection of original programmes – from food shows to true-life dramas and nail-biting reality entertainment – is the reason why VIA is the first choice in lifestyle television in numerous households.

Via is available on MultiChoice's DStv platform on channel 147 since 9 November 2015.

Honey

Honey is a bold and unscripted lifestyle TV channel created and connected for Africans. It has a mix from lifestyle to reality, food, and culture across the African Continent.

The channel is available on MultiChoice's DStv platform on channel 173 since 15 February 2021.

See also 
 Naspers
 UpperCase Media
 List of newspapers in South Africa
 List of magazines in South Africa

References

External links 
Official homepage
Media24 archives
Welkom Yizani trading platform

Companies based in Cape Town
Mass media in Cape Town
Publishing companies of South Africa